Stefanie Li Yun Tan (born 16 September 1992) is a Singaporean former professional tennis player.

Tan has career-high WTA rankings of 438 in singles, achieved on 15 May 2017, and 507 in doubles, reached on 8 May 2017. In her career, she won two singles and two doubles titles on the ITF Women's Circuit.

Tennis career
Playing for Singapore in Fed Cup, Tan has a win–loss record of 19–15.

In 2010, she represented Singapore in the 2010 Summer Youth Olympics.

Tan graduated from Texas Christian University in Fort Worth, Texas in 2015, where she played tennis for the Frogs. Prior to that, she had attended Raffles Institution in Singapore.

On 5 June 2016, Tan won her first professional singles title on the ITF Women's Circuit, at the Baku Cup Futures 2 tournament held at Baku, Azerbaijan. On 10 June, Tan partnered Kazakhstan's Kamila Kerimbayeva and won the doubles title at the Baku Cup Futures 3 tournament.

In the 2017 Southeast Asian Games, Tan claimed the bronze medal in the women's singles tournament, beating Malaysia's Jawairiah Noordin and Vietnam's Tran Thuy Thanh Truc before falling to eventual gold medalist Luksika Kumkhum of Thailand. It was Singapore's first medal for women's tennis in the SEA Games since 34 years ago by Lim Phi Lan who won the women's single silver medal in the 1995 SEA Games and also the first medal for Singapore tennis in the SEA Games in 22 years, last won by the men's tennis team who go a bronze medal. In the women's doubles tournament, she partnered Charmaine Shi Yi Seah but they lost in their opener.

ITF Circuit finals

Singles: 2 (2 titles)

Doubles: 4 (2 titles, 2 runner-ups)

References

External links
 
 
 

1992 births
Living people
Singaporean female tennis players
Singaporean sportspeople of Chinese descent
Tennis players at the 2010 Summer Youth Olympics
Southeast Asian Games bronze medalists for Singapore
Southeast Asian Games medalists in tennis
Competitors at the 2017 Southeast Asian Games
TCU Horned Frogs women's tennis players